MAASAI are a Swedish duo from Stockholm, formed in 2010. The duo consists of Dominique Teymouri (vocals) and Zackarias Ekelund (drums).

Members
 Dominique Teymouri
 Zackarias Ekelund

Discography

Singles
 Memories (2013)
 The Healer (2013)
 Forgive Me (2014)

Extended plays
 Frida Sundemo - Snow, MAASAI Remake (2012)

References

External links 
JaJaJa Music Spotlight Interview: MAASAI on 15 July 2014 by Emma Pressley

Swedish pop music groups
Musical groups established in 2010